Blue bugle is a common name for several plants and may refer to:

Ajuga reptans, the common bugle
Ajuga genevensis, the upright bugle